Pagabattina Simham is an Indian Telugu action drama film starring Krishna in three different roles 
 alongside an ensemble cast which includes Jaya Prada, Prabha, Geetha, Kaikala Satyanarayana and Prasad Babu. Produced by Kalidindi Vishwanatha Raju under Chandra Cine Arts, the film directed by P. Chandrasekhara Reddy had musical score by Chellapilla Satyam. The film was released on 3 September 1982 to generally positive reviews.

Cast 
 Krishna as Hari, Mohan Krishna, Muddu Krishna (Triple Role)
 Jaya Prada
 Geetha
 Prabha as Jhansi
 Kaikala Satyanarayana as Ranga
 Prasad Babu as Santhosh
 Allu Ramalingaiah as Sundara Murthy
Nagabhushanam as Picheswara Rao
Rajanala as Ramapuram Zamindar
Thyagaraju
Sarathi
Ramana Murthy as Inspector Ramakrishna
Pushpalatha
Chalapathi Rao

Music 

Chellapilla Satyam scored and composed the film's soundtrack.
 Aakasham Anchulu - 
 Pindhe Sandho -
 Singapore Shipanu -
 Vesukondhama -

References

Sources 
Pagabattina Simham on Moviebuff

1980s Telugu-language films
1982 films
Indian action drama films
1980s action drama films
Films directed by P. Chandrasekhara Reddy